= Kidds Fork, Virginia =

Unincorporated community in Virginia, United States

Coordinates: 37°56′33″N 77°18′02″W

Kidds Fork is an unincorporated community in Caroline County, in the U.S. state of Virginia.
